The Guam Open was a golf tournament held in Guam from 1996 to 1998. It was an event on the Asian Tour.

Winners

References 

Former Asian Tour events
Golf in Guam